Cocculinellidae is a family of small sea snails, deepwater limpets, marine gastropod mollusks in the clade Vetigastropoda (according to the taxonomy of the Gastropoda by Bouchet & Rocroi, 2005). This family has no subfamilies.

Genera 
Genera within this species include:
 Cocculinella Thiele, 1909

References